The 2006–07 season of the Slovak Second League (also known as 1. liga) was the fourteenth season of the league since its establishment. It began on 15 July 2006 and ended on 30 May 2007.

First stage

League table

Promotion playoff

League table

Relegation playoff

League table

See also
2006–07 Slovak Superliga

External links
 Tables and results at www.liga.cz

2. Liga (Slovakia) seasons
2006–07 in Slovak football
Slovak